is a town located in Kawabe District in Hyōgo Prefecture, Japan. , the town had an estimated population of 29,579 in 12552 households and a population density of 330 persons per km².

Geography 
Inagawa is located in the southeastern part of Hyōgo Prefecture. Although it is relatively short distance of 25 kilometers in a straight line from Osaka Station and Umeda Station, which are the terminal stations of Kansai region in  downtown Osaka, Inagawa retains the atmosphere of an old village with forests and rural scenery. The southern part of the town forms part of the Tada Basin, one of the prominent basins in Hyōgo Prefecture that continues into neighboring Kawanishi. A lot of nature remains in the northern part, and firefly, Japanese giant salamander and forest tree frogs inhabit. In addition, the Inagawa Astronomical Observatory Astropia is located within the Ono Alpsland, the area around the summit of Mt. Oya, the highest peak in the Hanshin region at an altitude of 753 meters. The mascot of Inagawa is Inabō (いなぼう), a character of a wild boar.

Surrounding municipalities 
Hyōgo Prefecture
 Kawanishi
 Takarazuka
 Sanda
 Tamba-Sasayama
Osaka Prefecture
 Nose

Climate
Inagawa has a Humid subtropical climate (Köppen Cfa) characterized by warm summers and cool winters with light snowfall.  The average annual temperature in Inagawa is 14.0 °C. The average annual rainfall is 1583 mm with September as the wettest month. The temperatures are highest on average in January, at around 25.8 °C, and lowest in January, at around 2.6 °C.

Demographics
Per Japanese census data, the population of Inagawa has quadrupled since the 1970s. The population growth rate for Inagawa is the highest in the nation, with numerous housing development planned and completed. In southern part of Inagawa, there are three large new towns, the Hankyu-Nissei Newtown (阪急日生ニュータウン), Inagawa Parktown (猪名川パークタウン), and Tsutsujigaoka (つつじが丘) and are located on the centre of Inagawa.

History 
The area of Inagawa was part of ancient Settsu Province. The Tada silver mine has been in operation since the Nara period. In the Edo Period, this area was tenryo territory under the direct control of the Tokugawa shogunate. The villages of Nakatani (中谷村) and Mutsuse (六瀬村) were established on April 1, 1889 with the creation of the modern municipalities system. The two villages merged on April 10,19555 to form the town of Inagawa.

Government
Inagawa has a mayor-council form of government with a directly elected mayor and a unicameral town council of 16 members. Inagawa, together with the city of Kawanishi, contributes three members to the Hyōgo Prefectural Assembly. In terms of national politics, the town is part of Hyōgo 5t district of the lower house of the Diet of Japan.

Economy
Since the closure of the Tada Silver Mine in 1973, Inagawa is largely a commuter town for neighboring Nishikawa and Osaka.

Education
Inagawa has six public elementary schools and two public middle school operated by the town government, and one public high school operated by the Hyōgo Prefectural Board of Education.

Transportation

Railways 
 Nose Electric Railway - Nissei Line

Highway 
  Shin-Meishin Expressway

Sister city relations
 (Ballarat, Victoria)

Local attractions
Tada Silver and Copper Mine (多田銀銅山) is located in the southern part of Inagawa. It is claimed, with some uncertainty, that Toyotomi Hideyoshi's treasures are buried there.

Notable people from Inagawa
Tatsuya Ikeda (池田達也), professional football player
Maiko Nakaoka (中岡麻衣子), professional football player
Eriko Hirose (廣瀬栄理子)
Nobuyuki Mori (森信行), musician
Ayumu Yamamoto (山本歩), professional football player

References

External links

Inagawa official website 

Towns in Hyōgo Prefecture